This is a list of rappers from Houston.

 3-2
 5th Ward Boyz
 5th Ward Juvenilez
 ABN
 Ameer Vann
 Baby Bash
 Big Hawk
 Big Mello
 Big Mike
 Big Moe
 Big Pokey
 Boss Hogg Outlawz
 Botany Boyz
 Bun B
 Bushwick Bill
 C-Note
 Chamillionaire
 Chedda Da Connect
 Chingo Bling
 Choice
 Coughee Brothaz
 Crime Boss
 Deep
 Devin the Dude
 DJ Premier
 DJ Screw
 Don Toliver
 Doughbeezy
 E.S.G.
 Expensive Taste
 Fat Pat
 Fat Tony
 Ganksta N-I-P
 Gemini
 Geto Boys
 Hyro Da Hero
 Juan Gotti
 Kirko Bangz
 Lecrae
 Lil' Flip
 Lil' Keke
 Lil' O
 Lil' Troy
 Lucky Luciano
 Maxo Kream
 Megan Thee Stallion
 Menace Clan
 Mike Jones
 Mr. Mike
 OG Ron C
 O.G. Style
 Paul Wall
 Pimp C
 Riff Raff
 Sauce Walka
 SaulPaul
 Scarface
 Screwed Up Click
 Slim Thug
 South Park Mexican
 The Color Changin' Click
 Tobe Nwigwe
 Too Much Trouble
 Trae tha Truth
 Travis Scott
 Trinity Garden Cartel
 T-Wayne
 UGK
 Ugly God
 Viper
 Willie D
 Z-Ro

Houston
Rappers